A hydrogen tank (other names- cartridge or canister) is used for hydrogen storage.

Low-pressure tanks
Various applications have allowed the development of different H2 storage scenarios.
Recently, the Hy-Can consortium has introduced a small one liter,  format.  Horizon Fuel Cells is now selling a refillable  metal hydride form factor for consumer use called HydroStik.

Type I
 Metal tank (steel/aluminum)
 Approximate maximum pressures: aluminum , steel .

Type II
 Aluminum tank with filament windings such as glass fiber/aramid or carbon fiber around the metal cylinder. See composite overwrapped pressure vessel.
 Approximate maximum pressures: aluminum/glass , steel/carbon or aramide .

Type III
 Tanks made from composite material, fiberglass/aramid or carbon fiber with a metal liner (aluminum or steel). See metal matrix composite.
 Approximate maximum pressures: aluminum/glass , aluminum/aramid , aluminium/carbon .

Type IV

 Composite tanks such of carbon fiber with a polymer liner (thermoplastic). See rotational molding and fibre-reinforced plastic.
 Approximate maximum pressure: .

Type V
 All-composite, linerless tank. Composites Technology Development (Colorado, USA) built a prototype tank for a satellite application in 2010 although it had an operating pressure of only 200 psi and was used to store argon.
 Approximate maximum pressure: .

Tank testing and safety considerations

In accordance with ISO/TS 15869 (revised):
 Burst test: the pressure at which the tank bursts, typically more than 2× the working pressure.
 Proof pressure: the pressure at which the test will be executed, typically above the working pressure.
 Leak test or permeation test, in NmL/hr/L (Normal liter of H2/time in hr/volume of the tank.)
 Fatigue test, typically several thousand cycles of charging/emptying.
 Bonfire test where the tank is exposed to an open fire.
 Bullet test where live ammunition is fired at the tank.

This specification was replaced by ISO 13985:2006 and only applies to liquid hydrogen tanks.

Actual Standard EC 79/2009
 U.S. Department of Energy maintains a hydrogen safety best practices site with a lot of information about tanks and piping.  They dryly observe "Hydrogen is a very small molecule with low viscosity, and therefore prone to leakage.".

Metal hydride storage tank

Magnesium hydride
Using magnesium for hydrogen storage, a safe but weighty reversible storage technology.
The charging process generates heat whereas the discharge process will require some heat to release the H2 contained in the storage material.

Other hydrides

See also sodium aluminium hydride

Research
 2008 - Japan, a clay-based film sandwiched between prepregs of CFRP.

See also

 Cascade storage system
 Compressed hydrogen tube trailer
 Cryo-adsorption
 Gas cylinder
 Hydrogen compressor
 Hydrogen safety
 Hydrogen technologies
 Hydrogen economy
 Liquid hydrogen
 Liquid hydrogen tank truck
 Sodium aluminium hydride
 Magnesium hydride
 Pressure regulator

References

External links
 Hydrogen Composite Tank Program

Hydrogen storage
Pressure vessels

fr:Stockage d'hydrogène